Peter Bofinger (born September 18, 1954) is a German economist and a former member of the German Council of Economic Experts.

Career
Following his studies, Bofinger worked as staff member to the Council of Economic Experts between 1978 and 1981. From 1984 until 1990, he was an economist at the Bundesbank. Since 1992, Bofinger has been a professor at the University of Würzburg. Between 1997 and 1999, he served as Dean of the university’s Department of Economics. In 1997, he turned down an offer to move to the Ludwig Maximilian University of Munich.

Nominated by Germany’s trade unions, Bofinger succeeded Jürgen Kromphardt as member of the Council of Economic Experts in 2004. He has in the past oftentimes disagreed with the Council’s conclusions. Between 2012 and 2017, he issued 26 of the Council’s 27 minority votes during that period. For example, he was the only member of the Council to advocate the adoption of a minimum wage in Germany: He argues that a minimum wage of €5 is necessary to prevent "wage dumping" and to ensure that full-time employment provides enough income. He does not think that a minimum wage would have a negative impact on employment.

In 2005, Chancellor Gerhard Schröder proposed that Bofinger should replace Otmar Issing on the Executive Board of the European Central Bank (ECB) the following year; the post instead went to Jürgen Stark. From December 2011 until May 2012, Bofinger served as member of the Jacques Delors Institute’s Tommaso Padoa-Schioppa group, a high-level expert group to reflect on the reform of the Economic and Monetary Union of the European Union.

Positions 
Bofinger criticized the awarding of the 2022 Nobel Memorial Prize in Economic Sciences to Ben Bernanke, Douglas Diamond and Philip Dybvig as "A noble award for a ‘popular misconception’", because the award committee's description of banking ("they receive money from people making deposits and channel it to borrowers") has been refuted by the Bank of England and the Deutsche Bundesbank.

Selected publications

Other activities

Non-profit organizations
 Business Forum of the Social Democratic Party of Germany, Member of the Advisory Board on Economic Policy (since 2020)
 European Council on Foreign Relations, Member of the Board
 Institute for New Economic Thinking (INET), Member of the Council on the Euro Zone Crisis (ICEC)
 Deutsche Industrieforschungsgemeinschaft Konrad Zuse, Member of the Senate
 Progressive Economy, Member of the Scientific Advisory Board
 Verein für Socialpolitik, Member of the Committee on Monetary Policy

Editorial boards
 International Journal of Economics and Finance (IJEF), Member of the Board of Editors
 Wirtschaftsdienst, Member of the Scientific Advisory Board

References

Further reading

External links
 Peter Bofinger's Curriculum Vitae at the University of Würzburg

1954 births
Living people
German economists
Keynesians